Marion Peck (born October 3, 1963 in Manila, the Philippines) is a pop surrealist painter based in the United States.

Biography

Marion Peck was born on October 3, 1963 in Manila, the Philippines, while her family was on a trip around the world. She grew up in Seattle, Washington, the youngest of four children.

Peck received a BFA from the Rhode Island School of Design in 1985. Subsequently, she studied in two different MFA programs: Syracuse University in New York and Temple University in Rome, after which she lived in Italy for a few years, absorbing art, landscape, and food. She lives in Los Angeles with her husband, Mark Ryden.

Peck became known for her work in Pop surrealism, and has exhibited her work in Paris, Rome, New York, Los Angeles, San Francisco, and Seattle. Her work has also been used for album covers, such as Waking the Mystics by Portland art rock group Sophe Lux. Peck released a book with husband, artist Mark Ryden called Sweet Wishes.

Personal life
On October 24, 2009, Peck married longtime partner Mark Ryden, also a pop surrealist in the woods of the Pacific Northwest Rainforest.

Publications

2007: I Cari Estini Exhibition Catalog
2004: Paintings by Marion Peck
2010: Sweet Wishes
2013: Animals
2016: "Lamb Land"
2017 reporcholis y el bosque

References

Feminist artists
1963 births
Living people
Fantastic art
Sympathy for the Record Industry artists
American women painters
Painters from Washington (state)
Artists from Seattle
People from Manila
Rhode Island School of Design alumni
Syracuse University alumni
Temple University alumni
21st-century American women artists
American pop artists
American surrealist artists